"Zet 'M Op!" is a single by the Dutch three-piece girl group Lisa, Amy & Shelley. It was released in the Netherlands as a digital download in May 2008, the second single from their first album 300% (2008). The song peaked at number 60 on the Dutch Singles Chart.

Track listing

Chart performance

Release history

References

2007 songs
2008 singles
O'G3NE songs
EMI Records singles